"California Blue" is a song written by Roy Orbison, Jeff Lynne, and Tom Petty. According to The Authorized Roy Orbison, Orbison recorded the song in April 1988 at Mike Campbell's garage in Los Angeles. "California Blue" was released as a single from Orbison's 22nd studio album, Mystery Girl, in July 1989, reaching the top 40 in Belgium, Ireland, and West Germany.

Personnel
 Roy Orbison – vocals, backing vocals, acoustic guitar
 Jeff Lynne – backing vocals, electric guitar, keyboards, bass guitar, producer
 Tom Petty – backing vocals, acoustic guitar
 Mike Campbell – acoustic guitar, mandolin
 Ian Wallace – drums, percussion

Charts

References

1988 songs
1989 singles
Roy Orbison songs
Song recordings produced by Jeff Lynne
Songs written by Jeff Lynne
Songs written by Tom Petty
Songs written by Roy Orbison
Virgin Records singles